Pitarenus cordatus, or the cordate venus clam, is a species of bivalve mollusc in the family Veneridae. It can be found throughout the Gulf of Mexico and the Florida Keys.

References

 Turgeon, D. D., W. G. Lyons, P. Mikkelsen, G. Rosenberg, and F. Moretzsohn. 2009. Bivalvia (Mollusca) of the Gulf of Mexico, Pp. 711–744 in Felder, D.L. and D.K. Camp (eds.), Gulf of Mexico–Origins, Waters, and Biota. Biodiversity. Texas A&M Press, Colleg 
 Huber, M. (2010). Compendium of bivalves. A full-color guide to 3,300 of the world's marine bivalves. A status on Bivalvia after 250 years of research. Hackenheim: ConchBooks. 901 pp., 1 CD-ROM. 

cordatus
Bivalves described in 1951
Bivalves of North America